Mania Velichia ( - Megalomania) is the debut album by heavy metal band Aria. One music video was made for this album: "Позади Америка" (America Left Behind).

Track listing

Personnel
Valery Kipelov - Vocals
Vladimir Holstinin - Guitar
Alik Granovsky - Bass
Aleksander Lvov - Drums
Kirill Pokrovsky - Keyboards

Additional personnel
Viktor Vekshtein - Manager
Vasily Gavrilov - Artist
Aleksander Gavrilov - Artist
Ekaterina Shevchenko - Design Artist

References

1985 debut albums
Aria (band) albums